Aimangala, Virajpet  is a village in the southern state of Karnataka, India. It is located in the Virajpet taluk of Kodagu district in Karnataka. It belongs to Mysore Division. It is located 29 KM towards South from District head quarters Madikeri. 10 KM from Virajpet. 247 KM from State capital Bangalore.

See also
 Kodagu
 Districts of Karnataka
 Mangalore

References

External links
 http://Kodagu.nic.in/

Villages in Kodagu district